The Pontifical Equestrian Order of St. Gregory the Great was established on 1 September 1831, by Pope Gregory XVI, seven months after his election as Pope.

The order is one of the five orders of knighthood of the Holy See. The honor is bestowed upon Catholic men and women (and certain notable non-Catholics) in recognition of their personal service to the Holy See and to the Catholic Church, through their unusual labors, their support of the Holy See, and the examples they set in their communities and their countries.

History and appointment

The inaugural brief states, in part, that "gentlemen of proven loyalty to the Holy See who, by reason of their nobility of birth and the renown of their deeds or the degree of their munificence, are deemed worthy to be honored by a public expression of esteem on the part of the Holy See". The end of the brief states that they must progressively maintain, by continued meritorious deed, the reputation and trust they had already inspired, and prove themselves worthy of the honor that had been conferred on them, by unswerving fidelity to God and to the sovereign Pontiff.

The awarding of the Order of St. Gregory the Great presents no particular obligations on the recipients toward the Catholic Church – except for the general ones stated above.

Insignia

An eight-pointed cross, the insignia of the order, bears a representation of St. Gregory on the obverse and on the reverse the motto  ("For God and Ruler"). The cross is suspended from a red and gold ribbon. In ecclesiastical heraldry, laymen awarded the high rank of Grand Cross can display a red and gold ribbon surrounding the shield in their personal coats of arms, but the recipients of the lower ranks place an appropriate ribbon below the shield. The difference between the civilian and military insignia is that the former group wears the cross hanging from a green crown of laurel, whereas the latter group wears the cross hanging from a trophy of arms.

Vestments and accoutrements
A green uniform was later prescribed by Pope Pius IX. The uniform contains a black beaver-felt hat decorated with black silk ribbons, silver metallic twisted rope, buttons and black ostrich feathers. The jacket, made of green wool, is trimmed with silver metallic thread, and has a tail, nine yellow metal buttons in the front and three buttons on the cuffs and is lined with black satin. Finally, the costume contains suspenders, several yellow and red rosettes, white leather gloves, and a short sword with a handle made of mother of pearl with a medallion of the order at the end.

Knights Grand Cross wear a sash and a badge or star on the left side of the breast; Commanders wear a cross around the neck; and Knights wear a smaller cross on the left breast of the uniform:

Notable members

Knight/Dame Grand Cross
Frederick Blakeney, 1964, Australian diplomat, Knight Grand Cross
Sir George Bowyer, 6th Baronet, Knight Grand Cross 
General Sir Peter Cosgrove, 2013, Knight Grand Cross, Governor-General of Australia
João Carlos Saldanha de Oliveira Daun, 1st Duke of Saldanha, Knight Grand Cross of the First Class
Rodrigo Augusto da Silva, Knight Grand Cross of the First Class
Duke Carl Ludvig Fouché d'Otrante (1930)
George Forbes, 7th Earl of Granard, Knight Grand Cross
Frank Hanna III, American entrepreneur and philanthropist, Knight Grand Cross
Alice von Hildebrand, 2013, Dame Grand Cross
Charles von Hügel, 1852, Knight Grand Cross
Johno Johnson, 2015, Australian politician
Dina Kawar, previous ambassador of Jordan to France
Gilbert Levine, 2016, American conductor, Knight Grand Cross
Count Christopher de Paus (1930)
Count Charles Woeste
 Count Hippolyte d'Ursel
 Count Léo d'Ursel, ambassador
 Baron Henry Delvaux de Fenffe, 1921, Governor of Liège
 J. L. P. Roche Victoria, 1952, Indian politician

Knight/Dame Commander with Star

Bob Hope, 1998, American entertainer (convert to Catholicism)
Francis Martin O'Donnell, 2007, Ambassador and Knight of Malta, previously in UN service for 32 years
G. K. Chesterton, 1934, English writer, philosopher, lay theologian, and literary and art critic (convert to Catholicism)
Gloria, Princess of Thurn and Taxis, 2008, Dame Commander with Star
Albert Gubay, 2011, founder of Kwik Save supermarket chain and Total Fitness

Knight Commander and Dame Commander
 Roy E. Disney, 1998
 Sir Patrick Duffy, 2017, British politician
 Hendrik Samuel Houthakker, 2003, Knight Commander with Silver Star, Member of Nixon's Council of Economic Advisers, husband of Anna-Teresa Tymieniecka.
 John Hume, 2012, Northern Irish politician and co-recipient of the 1998 Nobel Peace Prize
 Ignazio Jacometti, sculptor, appointed by Pope Pius IX.
 Saunders Lewis, 1975, Welsh nationalist politician, founder of Plaid Genedlaethol Cymru and prominent figure in Welsh-language literature (convert to Catholicism)
 Maurice Gerard Moynihan, 1959, Secretary of the Government of the Irish Free State and Governor of the Central Bank of Ireland
 Rupert Murdoch, 1998, Australian-American publisher and media entrepreneur
 Oscar Niemeyer, 1990, Brazilian modernist architect 
 Nikkyō Niwano, 1992, Japanese Buddhist practitioner who founded the Buddhist organization Risshō Kōsei Kai.
 James O'Donnell (organist), 1999, organist and Master of the Choristers, Westminster Abbey
 Lilianne Ploumen, 2017, Dutch politician
 Charles Poletti, 1945, Governor of New York, Army officer in charge of post World War II civil affairs in Italy
 John J. Raskob, American financial executive and businessman (DuPont, General Motors); financed the building of the Empire State Building
 Carlo Emanuele Ruspoli, 3rd Duke of Morignano, 2004
 Paul Salamunovich, 1969, American choral conductor and expert on Gregorian chant.
 Sir Jimmy Savile OBE, 1990, English radio DJ and television presenter-broadcaster (In 2012, after Savile's death, an annulment of the honour was requested by the Archbishop of Westminster. This was declined on the basis that the life honour died with the individual.)
 Roger Wagner, by Pope Paul VI, American choral conductor
 Mordecai Waxman, 1998, Rabbi (Conservative Judaism)

Knight/Dame
Walter Annenberg, who created TV Guide
Thomas Bodkin, lawyer, art historian, art collector and curator
Joanna Bogle, 2013, British Roman Catholic writer and broadcaster
Phyllis Bowman, 1996, British journalist and pro-life campaigner
Henry Cooper, 1978, champion heavyweight boxer (convert to Catholicism)
John A. Creighton, 1898, businessman and philanthropist in Omaha
John Crichton-Stuart, 3rd Marquess of Bute
Ralph Downes, 1970, English organist, organist of the London Oratory, organ teacher and organ designer (including organ of the Royal Festival Hall London)
Jude Patrick Dougherty, 1999, American philosopher, Dean Emeritus of the School of Philosophy at the Catholic University of America
Bambang Soegeng, Chief of Staff of the Indonesian Army
Emanuele Luigi Galizia, Maltese architect and civil engineer
Joe Gladwin, British actor and comedian
Sheilagh Kesting, 2016, former Moderator of the General Assembly of the Church of Scotland and former Ecumenical Officer of the Church of Scotland
Ilyas Khan, British businessman and philanthropist, Chairman of Leonard Cheshire Disability 
George Malcolm, English choral conductor, harpsichordist and organist; former Master of the Music, Westminster Cathedral
Colin Mawby, 2006, English choral conductor and composer former Master of the Music, Westminster Cathedral 
John A. McCone, 1955, US Industrialist, former Director of the Central Intelligence Agency, and former head of the Atomic Energy Commission
George Menachery, 2008, Editor of the St Thomas Christian Encyclopaedia of India and Director of the SARAS, philanthropist
Jean Migneault, former Deputy Supreme Knight of the Knights of Columbus
Patrick Millen, 1991, New Zealand public servant
Ricardo Montalbán, 1998, Mexican actor
Paul Victor Obeng, 2009, Ghanaian mechanical engineer and statesman
Isabel Piczek, 1998, artist
Joseph Ryelandt, Belgian composer
Jovan Sundečić, 1886, Serbian Orthodox priest and Montenegrin official 
Ann Widdecombe, 2013, British politician
Michael Williams, 2001, English actor

See also
Papal Orders of Knighthood

Citations

General and cited references

External links
Association of Papal Orders in Great Britain 
Photograph
Catholic Knighthood article from Time Magazine, 25 Jun 1928, reporting an award of the Order of St. Gregory the Great

 
1831 establishments in the Papal States
Awards established in 1831